Either of two unrelated asanas in modern yoga:

 a variation of Shirshasana (yoga headstand), with one leg lowered to the floor
 A variant of Akarna Dhanurasana (shooting bow), a sitting pose, with one leg behind the head